The Luxapalila Valley Railroad  is a 38-mile short line freight railroad that operates between Columbus, Mississippi, and Belk, Alabama. The LXVR interchanges with the Columbus & Greenville, Kansas City Southern and Norfolk Southern. Commodities transported include forest products and waste products.
  
The LXVR was acquired by Genesee & Wyoming in 2008.

References

External links
Luxapalila Valley Railroad official webpage - Genesee and Wyoming website

Alabama railroads
Mississippi railroads
Genesee & Wyoming
Spin-offs of the Norfolk Southern Railway